Mohammad-Hossein Moeinpour was an Iranian military officer. He served as the commander of the Air Force from 2 October 1981 to 25 November 1983. He was a Major at the time appointed to the office, however, he was promoted two ranks and became a colonel to qualify the position. He resigned due to health reasons, however according to Pierre Razoux, Moeinpour was dismissed for his "excessive caution" and for a string of defections of pilots under his command.

See also
 List of Iranian commanders in the Iran–Iraq War

References

Commanders of Islamic Republic of Iran Air Force
Islamic Republic of Iran Army brigadier generals
Islamic Republic of Iran Army personnel of the Iran–Iraq War
2014 deaths